Fürstenberg-Heiligenberg was a county and later a principality in southern Baden-Württemberg, Germany, located in the historical territory of Heiligenberg. It was created as a partition of Fürstenberg-Baar in 1559, and it suffered one partition between itself and Fürstenberg-Donaueschingen in 1617. 

When Herman Egon of Fürstenberg-Heiligenberg was elevated to the estate of imperial princes (Reichsfürstenstand) in 1664, Fürstenberg-Heiligenberg was raised to a principality and existed as an imperially immediate territory. It inherited Fürstenberg-Donaueschingen in 1698, but following the extinction of its branch in 1716, it was  inherited by Fürstenberg-Fürstenberg.

Counts of Fürstenberg-Heiligenberg (1559–1664)
Joachim, 1559–1598
Frederick IV, 1598–1617
William II, 1617–1618
Egon VIII, 1618–1635
 Co-rulers:
Ernst Egon, 1635–1652
Ferdinand Frederick Egon, 1635–1662
Herman Egon, 1635–1664

Princes of Fürstenberg-Heiligenberg (1664–1716)
Herman Egon, 1664–1674
Anton Egon, 1674–1716

Herman Egon's two surviving brothers, Francis Egon and Wilhelm Egon, were also titular Princes of Fürstenberg-Heiligenberg, but they never ruled the principality.

References

Bibliography 

 
Fürstenberg (princely family)
Principalities of the Holy Roman Empire
States and territories established in 1559

de:Fürstenberg (schwäbisches Adelsgeschlecht)